Dame Charmian Jocelyn O'Connor  (née Bishop, born 4 August 1937) is a New Zealand physical organic chemist.  She became the first female professor of chemistry at the University of Auckland in 1986, and retired in 2004.

Early life and education
Born in Woodville on 4 August 1937, the daughter of Cecil and Kathrene Bishop, O'Connor was educated at Hastings High School and Auckland Girls' Grammar School. She went on to study chemistry at Auckland University College, graduating Bachelor of Science in 1957, Master of Science with first-class honours in 1958, and completing a PhD in physical organic chemistry in 1963 at what by that time had become the University of Auckland.

In 1963, she married Peter Selwyn O'Connor, and the couple had two children.

Academic and research career
O'Connor was appointed as a lecturer in chemistry at Auckland University College in 1958, rising to the rank of professor in 1986, and becoming Auckland's first female professor of chemistry. When she retired in 2004, O'Connor was conferred the title of professor emeritus by the University of Auckland.

O'Connor authored or co-authored more than 300 scientific papers in refereed journals. Her research focused on the mechanisms and kinetics of reactions involving biologically active compounds. In 1973, she was conferred the degree of Doctor of Science (DSc) by the University of Auckland on the basis of published papers submitted, becoming the first woman in New Zealand to be awarded a DSc.

During her career at Auckland, O'Connor held many administrative roles at the university, including serving as the inaugural assistant vice-chancellor, equal employment opportunities and staff development, from 1987 to 1998, and deputy vice-chancellor in 1994.

Other activities
O'Connor served as a member of the Ministerial Advisory Group for science and technology, and on the national commission for UNESCO. Between 1979 and 1981, she was the national president of the New Zealand Federation of University Women, and later was chair of the board of trustees of the Kate Edger Educational Charitable Trust for nine years from 2005. She served on the councils of a number of educational institutions, including the Manukau Institute of Technology, Unitec Institute of Technology, and the Diocesan School for Girls.

Between 1961 and 1962, O'Connor was the secretary of the Auckland branch of the New Zealand Institute of Chemistry, and was later a member of the Academy Council of the Royal Society of New Zealand.

In 1982, O'Connor was appointed as a justice of the peace.

Honours and awards
In the 1989 Queen's Birthday Honours, O'Connor was appointed a Commander of the Order of the British Empire, for services to chemistry, education and the community. She became a Dame Companion of the New Zealand Order of Merit, for services to chemistry and education, in the 2018 Queen's Birthday Honours.
 
O'Connor was elected a Fellow of the Royal Society of New Zealand in 1986, and is also a Fellow of the Royal Society of Chemistry and a Fellow of the New Zealand Institute of Chemistry.

In 2018, during the celebrations to mark 125 years of women's suffrage in New Zealand, the science faculty at the University of Auckland was temporarily renamed the Dame Charmian O'Connor Faculty of Science in honour of O'Connor's contribution to science.

References

1937 births
Living people
People from Woodville, New Zealand
People educated at Hastings Girls' High School
People educated at Auckland Girls' Grammar School
University of Auckland alumni
Academic staff of the University of Auckland
New Zealand women academics
Dames Companion of the New Zealand Order of Merit
New Zealand chemists
New Zealand women chemists
New Zealand women scientists
New Zealand justices of the peace
Fellows of the Royal Society of New Zealand
Fellows of the Royal Society of Chemistry
New Zealand Commanders of the Order of the British Empire
New Zealand scientists
Fellows of the New Zealand Institute of Chemistry